is a passenger railway station located in the town of Kami, Mikata District, Hyōgo, Japan, operated by West Japan Railway Company (JR West). It opened on March 1, 1912.

Lines

Station layout
The station consists of one ground-level side platform serving a single bi-directional track. The station is unattended.

Passenger statistics
In fiscal 2016, the station was used by an average of 8 passengers daily

Gallery

See also
List of railway stations in Japan

References

External links

 Station Official Site

Railway stations in Hyōgo Prefecture
Sanin Main Line
Railway stations in Japan opened in 1912
Kami, Hyōgo (Mikata)